LAKE (which stands for the founding members Lindsay, Ashley, Kenny, and Eli) is an American indie pop band, signed to Off Tempo, based in Langley, Washington.

History 
Formed in 2005, in Olympia, Washington, they are best known for composing the end song to the Cartoon Network show Adventure Time, entitled "Christmas Island" or "The Island Song" (written by Ashley Eriksson). A version of the song was featured on their third album, Let's Build a Roof. Another Adventure Time episode entitled "Shh!", featured their song "No Wonder I", and another episode, entitled "The Music Hole" featured their song "I Look Up To You." Their most recent contribution was their short tune "Greatly Appreciated", sung in Season 8, Episode 25, "Min and Marty."

On August 22, 2015, the band celebrated their 10-year anniversary by playing all their albums from start to finish in a 12-hour marathon set at Bayview Hall, Whidbey Island, Washington. Their ninth album, Roundelay, was released on April 25, 2020.

Musical style
Lake features male and female vocals backed by guitars, keyboards and occasionally horns. AllMusic referred to Lake as being "one of several brainy and sweet indie pop bands... to call the Pacific Northwest their home." These characteristics were also noted in their reviews by Pitchfork Media. Like many artists on K Records, their style is lo-fi.

Album overview

Studio albums

 First Album (July 19, 2006)

 Cassette (October 1, 2006)

 Oh, The Places We'll Go (October 10, 2008)

 Let's Build a Roof (October 6, 2009)

 Giving and Receiving (April 5, 2011)

 Circular Doorway (July 17, 2013)

 The World is Real (September 17, 2013)

 Forever or Never (April 7, 2017)

 Roundelay (April 24, 2020)

References

External links
Official website
LAKE's profile on Off Tempo's website
Pitchfork Media reviews

Indie pop groups from Washington (state)
K Records artists
Tapete Records artists